Dame Eileen June Atkins,  (born 16 June 1934) is an English actress and occasional screenwriter. She has worked in the theatre, film, and television consistently since 1953. In 2008, she won the BAFTA TV Award for Best Actress and the Emmy Award for Outstanding Supporting Actress in a Miniseries or Movie for Cranford. She is also a three-time Olivier Award winner, winning Best Supporting Performance in 1988 (for Multiple roles) and Best Actress for The Unexpected Man (1999) and Honour (2004). She was appointed Commander of the Order of the British Empire (CBE) in 1990 and Dame Commander of the Order of the British Empire (DBE) in 2001.

Atkins joined the Royal Shakespeare Company in 1957 and made her Broadway debut in the 1966 production of The Killing of Sister George, for which she received the first of four Tony Award nominations for Best Actress in a Play in 1967. She received subsequent nominations for, Vivat! Vivat Regina! (1972), Indiscretions (1995) and The Retreat from Moscow (2004). Other stage credits include The Tempest (Old Vic 1962), Exit the King (Edinburgh Festival and Royal Court 1963), The Promise (New York 1967), The Night of the Tribades (New York 1977), Medea (Young Vic 1985), A Delicate Balance (Haymarket, West End 1997) and Doubt (New York 2006).

Atkins co-created the television dramas Upstairs, Downstairs (1971–1975) and The House of Elliot (1991–1994) with Jean Marsh. She also wrote the screenplay for the 1997 film Mrs Dalloway. Her film appearances include I Don't Want to Be Born (1975), Equus (1977), The Dresser (1983), Let Him Have It (1991), Wolf (1994), Jack and Sarah (1995), Gosford Park (2001), Cold Mountain (2003), Vanity Fair (2004), Scenes of a Sexual Nature (2006), Evening (2007), Last Chance Harvey (2008), Robin Hood (2010) and Magic in the Moonlight (2014).

Early life
Atkins was born in the Mothers' Hospital in Lower Clapton, a Salvation Army maternity hospital in East London. Her mother, Annie Ellen (née Elkins), was a barmaid who was 46 when Eileen was born, and her father, Arthur Thomas Atkins, was a gas meter reader who was previously under-chauffeur to the Portuguese Ambassador. She was the third child in the family and when she was born the family moved to a council home in Tottenham. Her father did not, in fact, know how to drive and was responsible, as under-chauffeur, mainly for cleaning the car. At the time Eileen was born, her mother worked in a factory the whole day and then as a barmaid in the Elephant & Castle at night. When Eileen was three, a Gypsy woman came to their door selling lucky heather and clothes pegs. She saw little Eileen and told her mother that her daughter would be a famous dancer. Her mother promptly enrolled her in a dance class. Although she hated it, she studied dancing from age 3 to 15 or 16. From age 7 to 15, which covered the last four years of the Second World War (1941–45), she danced in working men's club circuits for 15 shillings a time as "Baby Eileen". During the war, she performed as well at London's Stage Door canteen for American troops and sang songs like "Yankee Doodle." At one time she was attending dance class four or five times a week.

Once, when she was given a line to recite, someone told her mother that she had a Cockney accent. Her mother was appalled but speech lessons were too expensive for the family. Fortunately, a woman took interest in her and paid for her to be educated at Parkside Preparatory School in Tottenham. Eileen Atkins has since publicly credited the Principal, Miss Dorothy Margaret Hall, for the wise and firm guidance under which her character developed. From Parkside she went on to The Latymer School, a grammar school in Edmonton, London. By 12, she was a professional in panto in Clapham and Kilburn. One of her grammar school teachers who used to give them religious instruction, an Ernest J. Burton, spotted her potential and, without charge, rigorously drilled away her Cockney accent. He also introduced her to the works of William Shakespeare. She studied under him for two years.

When she was 14 or 15 and still at Latymer's, she also attended "drama demonstration" sessions twice a year with this same teacher. At around this time (though some sources say she was 12), her first encounter with Robert Atkins took place. She was taken to see Atkins' production of King John at the Regent's Park Open Air Theatre. She wrote to him saying that the boy who played Prince Arthur was not good enough and that she could do better. Atkins wrote back and asked that she come to see him. On the day they met, Atkins thought she was a shop girl and not a school girl. She gave a little prince speech and he told her to go to drama school and come back when she was older.

Burton came to an agreement with Eileen's parents that he would try to get her a scholarship for one drama school and that if she did not get the scholarship he would arrange for her to do a teaching course in some other drama school. Her parents were not at all keen on the fact that she would stay in school until 16 as her sister had left at 14 and her brother at 15 but somehow they were persuaded. Eileen was in Latymer's until 16. Out of 300 applicants for a RADA scholarship, she got down to the last three but was not selected, so she did a three-year course on teaching at the Guildhall School of Music and Drama. But, although she was taking the teaching course, she also attended drama classes and in fact performed in three plays in her last year. This was in the early 1950s. In her third and last year she had to teach once a week, an experience she later said she hated. She graduated from Guildhall in 1953.

As soon as she left Guildhall she got her first job with Robert Atkins in 1953: as Jaquenetta in Love's Labour's Lost at the same Regent's Park Open Air Theatre where she was brought to see Atkins' King John production years before. She was also, very briefly, an assistant stage manager at the Oxford Playhouse until Peter Hall fired her for impudence. She was also part of repertory companies performing in Billy Butlin's holiday camp in Skegness, Lincolnshire. It was there when she met Julian Glover.

It took nine years (1953–62) before she was working steadily.

Stage
Atkins joined the Guild Players Repertory Company in Bangor, County Down, Northern Ireland, as a professional actress in 1952. She appeared as the nurse in Harvey at the Repertory Theatre, Bangor, in 1952. In 1953 she appeared as an attendant in Love's Labours Lost at the Regent's Park Open Air Theatre. Her London stage debut was in 1953 as Jaquenetta in Robert Atkins's staging of Love's Labour's Lost at the Open Air Theatre in Regent's Park.

Atkins has regularly returned to the life and work of Virginia Woolf for professional inspiration. She has played the writer on stage in Patrick Garland's adaptation of A Room of One's Own and also in Vita and Virginia, winning the Drama Desk Award for Outstanding One-Person Show and an Obie Award for A Room of One's Own in which she also played in the 1990 television version; she also provided the screenplay for the 1997 film adaptation of Woolf's novel Mrs. Dalloway, and made a cameo appearance in the 2002 film version of Michael Cunningham's Woolf-themed novel, The Hours.

Atkins joined the Stratford Memorial Theatre Company in 1957 and stayed for two seasons. She was with the Old Vic in its 1961–62 season (she appeared in the Old Vic's Repertoire Leaflets of February–April 1962 and April–May 1962).

Film and television
She appeared as Maggie Clayhanger in all six episodes of Arnold Bennett's Hilda Lessways from 15 May to 19 June 1959, produced by BBC Midlands with Judi Dench and Brian Smith. In the 1960 Shakespeare production An Age of Kings she played Joan of Arc.

She helped create two television series. Along with fellow actress, Jean Marsh, she created the concept for an original television series, Behind the Green Baize Door, which became the award-winning ITV series Upstairs, Downstairs (1971–75). Marsh played maid Rose for the duration of the series but Atkins was unable to accept a part because of stage commitments. The same team was also responsible for the BBC series The House of Eliott (1991–93).

Her film and television work includes Sons and Lovers (1981), Smiley's People (1982), Oliver Twist (1982), Titus Andronicus (1985), A Better Class of Person (1985), Roman Holiday (1987), The Lost Language of Cranes (1991), Cold Comfort Farm (1995), Talking Heads (1998), Madame Bovary (2000), David Copperfield (2000), Wit (2001) and Bertie and Elizabeth (2002), Cold Mountain (2003), What a Girl Wants (2003), Vanity Fair (2004), Ballet Shoes (2005) and Ask the Dust (2006).

In the autumn of 2007, she co-starred with Dame Judi Dench and Sir Michael Gambon in the BBC One drama Cranford playing the central role of Miss Deborah Jenkyns. This performance earned her the 2008 BAFTA Award for best actress, as well as the Emmy Award. In September 2007 she played Abigail Dusniak in Waking the Dead Yahrzeit (S6:E11-12).

In 2009 Atkins played the evil Nurse Edwina Kenchington in the BBC Two black comedy Psychoville. Atkins replaced Vanessa Redgrave as Eleanor of Aquitaine in the blockbuster movie Robin Hood, starring Russell Crowe, which was released in the UK in May 2010. The same year, she played Louisa in the dark comedy film Wild Target.

Atkins and Jean Marsh, creators of the original 1970s series of Upstairs, Downstairs, were among the cast of a new BBC adaptation, shown over the winter of 2010–11. The new series is set in 1936. Marsh again played Rose while Atkins was cast as the redoubtable Maud, Lady Holland. In August 2011, it was revealed that Atkins had decided not to continue to take part as she was unhappy with the scripts. In September 2011, Atkins joined the cast of ITV comedy-drama series Doc Martin playing the title character's aunt, Ruth Ellingham. She returned as Aunt Ruth for the show's sixth series in September 2013, the seventh in September 2015 and eighth in September 2017.

Atkins starred as Lady Spence with Matthew Rhys in an adaptation of Daphne du Maurier's The Scapegoat, shown in September 2012.

She has portrayed Queen Mary on two occasions, in the 2002 television film Bertie and Elizabeth and in the 2016 Netflix-produced television series The Crown.

Atkins portrayed graduate school professor Evelyn Ashford to Vivian Bearing (Emma Thompson) in Wit, a 2001 American television movie directed by Mike Nichols. The teleplay by Nichols and Emma Thompson is based on the 1999 Pulitzer Prize winning play of the same title by Margaret Edson. The film was shown at the Berlin International Film Festival on 9 February 2001 before being broadcast by HBO on 24 March. It was shown at the Edinburgh Film Festival and the Warsaw Film Festival later in the year.

Radio
Atkins had a guest role in BBC Radio 4's long-running rural soap The Archers in September 2016, playing Jacqui, the juror who persuades her fellow jurors to acquit Helen Titchener (née Archer) of the charge of attempted murder and wounding with intent of her abusive husband, Rob.

Personal life
Atkins was married to actor Julian Glover in 1957; they divorced in 1966. (A day after his divorce, Glover married actress Isla Blair.) She married her second husband, Bill Shepherd, on 2 February 1978. Shepherd died on 24 June 2016.

In 1997, she wrote the screenplay for Mrs Dalloway, starring Vanessa Redgrave. The film received positive reviews but was a box-office failure. It was a financial disaster for Atkins and her husband, who had invested in it. She said of this incident: "I have to work. I was nearly bankrupted over Mrs Dalloway, and if you are nearly bankrupted, you are in trouble for the rest of your life. I don't have a pension. In any case, it doesn't hurt me to work. I think it's quite good, actually."

"All through my career, I have tried to do new work, but there is a problem in the West End as far as new work is concerned. As a theatregoer, I get bored with seeing the same old plays again and again. I felt terrible the other night because I bumped into Greta Scacchi and she asked me if I was coming to see her in The Deep Blue Sea. I said, 'Greta, I'm so old, I've seen it so many times. I've seen it with Peggy Ashcroft, with Vivien Leigh, with Googie Withers, with Penelope Wilton and I played it myself when I was 19. I can't bring myself to see it again.' She was very sweet about it."

In 1995, Atkins was diagnosed with breast cancer and treated for the condition. She has recovered. Living alone in widowhood during the COVID lockdown, Atkins (at age 87) completed her autobiography Will She Do?. She read an abridged version on BBC Radio 4.

Filmography

Film

Television

Theatre

Honours
Atkins was created a Commander of the Order of the British Empire (CBE) in 1990. She was made a Dame Commander of the Order of the British Empire (DBE) on her 67th birthday, 16 June 2001. On 23 June 2010, she was awarded the degree of Doctor of Letters, honoris causa, by Oxford University. On 5 December 2005 she received the degree of Doctor of Arts, honoris causa, from City University London. She is a member of the American Theater Hall of Fame; she was inducted in 1998.

Awards and nominations

Theatre Awards 
Tony Awards

Drama Desk Awards

Olivier Awards

Film and Television Awards

Notes

References

External links

 Eileen Atkins at tcm.com

Eileen Atkins interviewed by Beth Stevens about performing in Doubt on Broadway
Eileen Atkins interviewed on Theater Talk about performing in Doubt on Broadway
 Performance details listed at the Theatre Collection archive, University of Bristol

1934 births
Living people
Actresses awarded damehoods
Alumni of the Guildhall School of Music and Drama
Best Actress BAFTA Award (television) winners
Dames Commander of the Order of the British Empire
Drama Desk Award winners
English film actresses
English stage actresses
English television actresses
Actresses from London
Laurence Olivier Award winners
Outstanding Performance by a Supporting Actress in a Miniseries or Movie Primetime Emmy Award winners
Outstanding Performance by a Cast in a Motion Picture Screen Actors Guild Award winners
Royal Shakespeare Company members
English Shakespearean actresses
People educated at The Latymer School
English women writers
British women screenwriters
English screenwriters
20th-century English actresses
21st-century English actresses
Writers from London